Manuel Manzo (born 10 February 1952) is a Mexican former footballer who played professionally in the Liga MX. He is an Olympian.

Career
Born in Mexico City, Manzo began his career with Club León at age 16. He made his Primera División debut, and quickly had success.

Manzo won the Primera División with Pumas in the 1980–81 season.

Manzo made three appearances for the Mexico national football team in 1981. He also played for Mexico at the 1972 Summer Olympics in Munich.

After he retired from playing, Manzo became a football coach. He managed Toros Neza from 1997 to 1998.

Personal
Manzo suffered from alcoholism, and nearly died while under contract with Chivas after he wandered into an empty swimming pool while drunk.

References

1952 births
Living people
Footballers from Mexico City
Mexican expatriate footballers
Mexican footballers
Mexico international footballers
Olympic footballers of Mexico
Footballers at the 1972 Summer Olympics
Atlético Español footballers
C.D. Guadalajara footballers
Club Universidad Nacional footballers
Houston Hurricane players
Tigres UANL footballers
Atlante F.C. footballers
Liga MX players
North American Soccer League (1968–1984) players
Expatriate soccer players in the United States
Mexican expatriate sportspeople in the United States
Association football midfielders